Afsaruddin Ahmad Khan (1940 – 17 November 2021) was a Bangladesh Awami League politician. He served as a Jatiya Sangsad member representing the Gazipur-4 constituency during 1996–2001 and the state minister for housing and public works during 1996–1997. He was the younger brother of Tajuddin Ahmad, the inaugural Prime Minister of Bangladesh.

Early life and family
Khan was born to Maulavi Muhammad Yasin Khan and Meherunnesa Khanam. He had two brothers and six sisters.

Career
Khan was elected to parliament in 1996 from Gazipur-4. He served as the State Minister for public works in the First Sheikh Hasina Cabinet from 1996 to 1997. In 2012, by-elections were called in Gazipur-4, after Sohel Taj resigned. He contested the 2012 by polls in Gazipur-4 as an independent candidate. He lost the election to Simin Hossain Rimi, the Bangladesh Awami League candidate.

Personal life
Khan was the younger brother of Tajuddin Ahmad, former Prime Minister of Bangladesh. Tajuddin's son, Sohel Taj, was elected to represent the same constituency, Gazipur-4, in 2001 and 2008. After Sohel's resignation, by-election was held in 2021 and Khan participated as an independent candidate. But he lost the election to Simin Hossain Rimi, a sister of Sohel.

References

1940 births
2021 deaths
Awami League politicians
7th Jatiya Sangsad members
State Ministers of Housing and Public Works (Bangladesh)
Date of birth missing
Place of birth missing